Ann and Harold was the first ever British television serial. The program, written by Louis Goodrich, ran on BBC television for a total of five 20-minute episodes in July and August 1938. It starred Ann Todd and William Hutchison in the "story of a London society couple's romance, from their meeting to their grand society wedding."

No known footage or photographs of the show survive, as it was aired live before any means of recording television programs existed.

External links

References

1938 British television series debuts
1938 British television series endings
BBC television dramas
Lost BBC episodes
1930s British television series
Black-and-white British television shows